Baboo operates the following scheduled services:

Europe
France
Biarritz – Biarritz - Anglet - Bayonne Airport [seasonal]
Bordeaux – Mérignac Airport
Nice – Côte d'Azur Airport
Saint-Tropez – La Môle Airport [seasonal]
Italy
Florence – Peretola Airport
Naples – Naples International Airport
Rome – Leonardo da Vinci Airport
Venice – Venice Marco Polo Airport
Spain
Ibiza – Ibiza Airport [seasonal]
Valencia – Valencia Airport
Switzerland
Geneva – Geneva Airport (base)
Lugano – Lugano Airport 
Zurich – Zurich Airport

Terminated destinations
Austria – Vienna
Bulgaria – Sofia
Croatia – Zagreb
Czech Republic – Prague
France – Figari, Marseille
Greece – Athens
Italy – Milan Malpensa, Naples
Morocco – Tangier
Romania – Bucharest
Russia – St Petersburg
Switzerland – Zurich
Tunisia – Djerba, Monastir
United Kingdom – London City, Oxford

References

Lists of airline destinations